The 2020 TOYOTA U.S. Figure Skating Championships were held from January 20–26, 2020 at the Greensboro Coliseum Complex in Greensboro, North Carolina. Medals were awarded in the disciplines of men's singles, ladies' singles, pair skating, and ice dance at the senior and junior levels. The results were part of the U.S. selection criteria for the 2020 Four Continents Championships, 2020 World Junior Championships, and the 2020 World Championships.

Greensboro was announced as the host in November 2018. The city previously hosted the event in 2011 and 2015.

Qualifying 
U.S. Figure Skating implemented a new qualifying structure beginning from the 2019–20 season. Competitors qualified through the National Qualifying Series (NQS), Regional (singles) and Sectional (pairs/ice dance) Challenges, and Sectional (singles) and U.S. (pairs/ice dance) Finals, held from June to November 2019, or earned a bye. The NQS is not mandatory, but the top six singles athletes in each section may earn a bye to the Sectional Singles Final, and the top three teams/couples in pairs and ice dance may earn a bye to the U.S. Final in their respective disciplines. The top four finishers at the Sectional Finals (singles) and the top twelve finishers at the U.S. Finals (pairs/ice dance) earned a spot at the National Figure Skating Championships.

Juvenile, intermediate, and novice skaters qualified for the National High Performance Development Team and Camp in lieu of participating at U.S. Championships.

Minimum TES requirements 
In the senior division, all competitors that qualify through their placement at a Sectional Singles Final, the U.S. Pairs Final, or the U.S. Dance Final, must have met a minimum combined Technical Elements Score (TES) during the season to compete at the U.S. Figure Skating Championships.

Entries 
A list of qualified skaters was published on November 26, 2019.

Seniors 
Several qualified skaters were unable to compete due to failure to achieve the minimum TES: Andrew Austin, Ben Jalovick, Tony Lu, and Jun Hong Chen in men's singles, Megan Wessenberg in ladies' singles, and Brynne McIsaac / Mark Sadusky in pairs.

Juniors 
Names with an asterisk (*) denote novice skaters.

Novice 
The top two novice finishers at each Sectional in men's and ladies' singles were added to the junior event at U.S. Championships.

Changes to preliminary entries

Medal summary

Senior

Junior

Senior results

Senior men

Senior ladies

Senior pairs

Senior ice dance

Junior results

Junior men

Junior ladies

Junior pairs

Junior ice dance

International team selections

World Championships
The 2020 World Figure Skating Championships will be held in Montreal, Quebec, Canada from March 16–22, 2020. U.S. Figure Skating announced the team on January 26.

Four Continents Championships
The 2020 Four Continents Figure Skating Championships will be held in Seoul, South Korea from February 4–9, 2020. U.S. Figure Skating announced the team on January 26.

World Junior Championships
Commonly referred to as "Junior Worlds", the 2020 World Junior Figure Skating Championships will take place in Tallinn, Estonia from March 2–8, 2020. U.S. Figure Skating announced the men's and ladies' selection camp roster on January 26. The entire team was announced on January 29.

U.S. Figure Skating invited the following skaters to a selection camp for Junior Worlds.

Winter Youth Olympics
The 2020 Winter Youth Olympics were held in Lausanne, Switzerland from January 10–15, 2020. The team was announced on December 17, 2019, as the U.S. Championships were held after the Winter Youth Olympics.

References

External links 
 Official website 

U.S. Figure Skating Championships
U.S. Figure Skating Championships
U.S. Figure Skating Championships
U.S. Figure Skating Championships